In propositional logic, tautological consequence is a strict form of logical consequence in which the tautologousness of a proposition is preserved from one line of a proof to the next. Not all logical consequences are tautological consequences. A proposition  is said to be a tautological consequence of one or more other propositions (...) in a proof with respect to some logical system if one is validly able to introduce the proposition onto a line of the proof within the rules of the system and in all cases when each of those one or more other propositions (...) are true, the proposition  also is true.

Another way to express this preservation of tautologousness is by using truth tables.

Example
 = "Socrates is a man."
 = "All men are mortal."
 = "Socrates is mortal."

The conclusion of this argument is a logical consequence of the premises because it is impossible for all the premises to be true while the conclusion false.

Reviewing the truth table, it turns out the conclusion of the argument is not a tautological consequence of the premise. Not every row that assigns T to the premise also assigns T to the conclusion. In particular, it is the second row that assigns T to a ∧ b, but does not assign T to c.

Denotation and properties
It follows from the definition that if a proposition p is a contradiction then p tautologically implies every proposition, because there is no truth valuation that causes p to be true and so the definition of tautological implication is trivially satisfied. Similarly, if p is a tautology then p is tautologically implied by every proposition.

See also
 Logical consequence
 Tautology (logic)
 Truth table

Notes

References
 Barwise, Jon, and John Etchemendy. Language, Proof and Logic. Stanford: CSLI (Center for the Study of Language and Information) Publications, 1999. Print.
 Kleene, S. C. (1967) Mathematical Logic,   reprinted 2002, Dover Publications, .

Logical consequence